Parigi is a coastal district of Pangandaran Regency, West Java, Indonesia. The district is the regency seat of Pangandaran Regency. Parigi borders Indian Ocean to the south.

Administrative divisions 
Parigi is divided into 10 villages which are as follows:

Bojong
Cibenda
Ciliang
Cintakarya
Cintaratu
Karangbenda
Karangjaladri
Parakanmanggu
Parigi
Selasari

Tourism 
Parigi is renowned for its Batu Hiu Beach (Shark's Rock Beach).

Climate
Parigi has a tropical rainforest climate (Af) with heavy to very heavy rainfall year-round.

References 

Pangandaran Regency
Populated places in West Java
Regency seats of West Java